"Written on Her" is a song by American rapper Birdman featuring British singer Jay Sean. It was released as a single on June 23, 2009. The song was produced by Oddz N Endz, and samples the Deadmau5 remix of "The Longest Road" by Morgan Page featuring Lissie.

The song was first played during an interview on Westwood Radio 1 with Birdman and Jay Sean. It was only an iTunes Store bonus track for the 2009 album Priceless However, the remix featuring Flo Rida and Mack Maine was included in the deluxe version of the album.

'Written on Her' became Birdman's first British single, when released digitally in the UK on December 7, 2009.

Music video
The music video was premiered on YouTube on August 14, 2009. The video was produced alongside the video for "Down." The video was filmed in Buckinghamshire in a mansion, an enormous private mansion and park where Mark Ronson hosted his 33rd birthday and the place where The Golden Compass was filmed. UK models Bianca Simmone and Maysoon Shaladi make an appearance. On September 22, 2009  was the video added to MTV, MTV2 & BET.

Remix 
The official remix features original collaborator Jay Sean and new verses by Flo Rida and Mack Maine. It was included in the deluxe edition of the album. However, the iTunes version of the remix does not feature Flo Rida.

Charts

References 

2009 singles
2009 songs
Birdman (rapper) songs
Jay Sean songs
Cash Money Records singles
Songs written by Jay Sean